Gladstone is a coastal city in the Gladstone Region, Queensland, Australia. Gladstone has an urban population of 34,703, and together with Boyne Island and Tannum Sands, had an estimated population of 50,317 at August 2021.

Situated between the Calliope and Boyne Rivers, Gladstone is home to Queensland's largest multi-commodity shipping port, the Port of Gladstone.

Gladstone is the largest town within the Gladstone Region and the headquarters of Gladstone Regional Council is located in Gladstone.

History 

Before European settlement, the Gladstone region was home of the Gooreng Gooreng, Toolooa (or Tulua), Meerooni and Baiali (or Byellee) Aboriginal tribes.

In May 1770, under the command of James Cook, sailed by the entrance to Gladstone Harbour under the cover of darkness. Matthew Flinders, during his 1801–1803 circumnavigation of Australia, became the first recorded European to sight the harbour in August 1802. He named the harbour Port Curtis, after Admiral Roger Curtis, a man who was of assistance to Flinders a year earlier at the Cape of Good Hope. John Oxley conducted further exploration of the harbour and surrounding countryside in November 1823. Oxley was dismissive of the region, noting the harbour was difficult to enter, the countryside was too dry, and the timber useless for construction purposes.

Nevertheless, in 1847 the British attempted to establish the new colony of North Australia at Port Curtis. Colonel George Barney was chosen to lead this experiment in colonisation and his expedition was eventful. On 25 January 1847, the Lord Auckland, carrying 87 soldiers and convicts, arrived off the southern entrance of Port Curtis and promptly ran aground on shoals off the southern tip of Facing Island. The settlers spent seven weeks on the island before being rescued by the supply ship Thomas Lowry and delivered the intended site of settlement, the region now known as Barney Point. On 30 January at a proclamation ceremony, Barney was sworn in as Lieutenant Governor of the colony of North Australia. The convict settlement lasted barely two months and cost the Imperial government £15,000. A change of government in Britain ordered the withdrawal of Barney and the settlers. However, interest in the region remained.

By 1853, Francis MacCabe was surveying the site of a new town on the shores of Port Curtis under the protection of several detachments of Native Police. Maurice O'Connell was appointed government resident the following year, resulting in an influx of free settlers as land became available throughout the region.

Gladstone State School opened on 1 April 1861 and is one of the oldest state primary schools in Queensland. On 14 November 1968 its name was changed to be Gladstone Central State School.

In 1863, the town became a Municipality with Richard Hetherington elected Gladstone's first mayor. The fledgling town was named after the British Prime Minister William Ewart Gladstone and has a 19th-century marble statue on display in its town museum.

Development of Gladstone was slow until 1893 when a meatworks was established at Parsons Point.

Parson's Point Provisional School opened on 1 August 1898, becoming Parson's Point State School on 1 February 1913. The school was relocated and renamed Gladstone South State School in 1945.

On 2 March 1949, a major cyclone hit Gladstone, resulting in extensive damage to the town.

Gladstone State High School opened on 2 February 1953.

In 1963, Queensland Alumina Limited established its alumina refinery on the site of the old meatworks. Gladstone's port facilities were expanded and the city launched into an era of industrial development and economic prosperity.

Gladstone West State School opened on 24 January 1966.

Rosella Park State School was opened on 17 May 1971.

Clinton State School opened on 29 January 1974.

Toolooa State High School opened on 27 January 1981.

Kin Kora State School opened on 9 October 1981.

In 1985 the Gladstone Christian Community School opened as a primary school operated by the Gladstone Baptist Church. In 1998, it changed its name to Trinity College. From 2013 it offered classes from Prep to Year 12.

St Stephens Lutheran College opened in 1998, but closed at the end of 2016. The school had lost 20% of its enrolment due to families moving away to find work, leaving only 216 students in classes ranging from Prep to Year 12 making it no longer viable to operate the school.

Gladstone Cinemas, a locally owned and operated independent cinema, opened in March 2001.

The Gladstone Library building opened in 2003.

In the  Gladstone had a population of 33,418 people.

At June 2018 Gladstone, together with Boyne Island and Tannum Sands, had an estimated urban population of 45,130.

Heritage listings 
Gladstone has a number of heritage-listed sites, including:
 94 Auckland Street: Gladstone Central State School, Block B
 Gladstone-Monto Road: Glengarry Homestead
 Goondoon Street: Our Lady Star of the Sea Church & School
 1 Goondoon Street: Port Curtis Sailing Club Clubhouse
 33 Goondoon Street: Gladstone Post Office
 40 Goondoon Street: Kullaroo House
 114 Goondoon Street: Commonwealth Bank Building
 144 Goondoon Street: Gladstone Regional Art Gallery and Museum (Old Town Hall)
 Roseberry Street: Fig Tree
 6 Short Street: Port Curtis Co-operative Dairy Association Ltd Factory
 16 Yarroon Street: Gladstone Court House

Population
According to the 2016 census of population, there were 33,418 people in the Gladstone urban centre.
 Aboriginal and Torres Strait Islander people made up 4.6% of the population. 
 76.0% of people were born in Australia. The next most common countries of birth were New Zealand 3.7%, Philippines 2.3%, England 2.1%, India 1.3% and South Africa 1.0%.
 84.4% of people only spoke English at home. Other languages spoken at home included Tagalog 1.1%, Filipino 0.8%, Afrikaans 0.5%, Mandarin 0.4% and Hindi 0.4%. 
 The most common responses for religion were No Religion 29.9%, Catholic 22.2% and Anglican 15.7%.

Geography

Gladstone and Rockhampton are the two major cities in the Central Queensland region.

Suburbs

 Gladstone Central*
 Barney Point
 Callemondah
 Clinton
 Glen Eden
 Kin Kora
 Kirkwood
 New Auckland

 O'Connell
 South Gladstone
 South Trees
 Sun Valley
 Telina
 Toolooa
 West Gladstone

* – the historic center of the city and major business district

Climate
Gladstone experiences a Tropical Savanna Climate (Köppen climate classification aw) and is one of the southernmost places in Australia to have this classification. These temperatures were recorded by the Bureau of Meteorology.
The temperature recording for the below table were performed at the following location— 23.86°S 151.26°E 75 m AMSL

Industry 

Gladstone's primary industries are mining-related. The Port of Gladstone is the fifth-largest multi-commodity port in Australia and the world's fourth-largest coal-exporting terminal. The port consists of a number of wharves and terminal facilities. Boyne Wharf is used by the Boyne Island aluminium smelter and was opened in August 1982. The western harbour basin has been expanded, primarily to allow increased exports of liquified natural gas (LNG). Furthermore, in 2016, a plant was constructed on Curtis Island to produce and export LNG, a construction project that contributed heavily to city's population and housing boom. Major exports include coal, alumina, aluminium, cement products, sodium cyanide and ammonium nitrate. Each year 50 million tonnes of coal passes through the port, making up 70% of the total exports.

Gladstone harbor is within the World Heritage Area of the Great Barrier Reef and has historically supported a thriving seafood industry. In August 2011, a Fisheries Queensland spokesman said they received reports of fish with milky eyes. A spokesman from the Gladstone Fish Markets claimed that diseased fish were still being caught in large numbers in November 2011. Losses to the local seafood industry have been estimated at A$36 million a year.

Gladstone is also a tourism destination, with cruise ships regularly docking at the port.

Education 
Gladstone has a range of primary schools and secondary schools.

Gladstone Central State School is a government primary (P-6) school for boys and girls at 74 Auckland Street. In 2017, the school had an enrolment of 342 students with 24 teachers (22 full-time equivalent) and 16 non-teaching staff (12 full-time equivalent).

Gladstone West State School is a government primary (P-6) school for boys and girls at Boles Street, West Gladstone. In 2017 the school had an enrolment of 647 students with 46 teachers (43 full-time equivalent) and 31 non-teaching staff (20 full-time equivalent).

Gladstone South State School is a government primary (P-6) school for boys and girls at 153 Toolooa Street, South Gladstone. In 2017 the school had an enrolment of 330 students with 22 teacher (20 full-time equivalent) and 24 non-teaching staff (16 full-time equivalent).

Clinton State School is a government primary (P-6) school for boys and girls at Harvey Street, Clinton. In 2017 the school had an enrolment of 912 students with 64 teachers (59 full-time equivalent) and 46 non-teaching staff (28 full-time equivalent).

Kin Kora State School is a government primary (P-6) school for boys and girls at 43 Hibiscus Avenue, Kin Kora. In 2017 the school had an enrolment of 801 students with 57 teachers (51 full-time equivalent) and 27 non-teaching staff (19 full-time equivalent).

Rosella Park School is a government school for boys and girls aged from five to eighteen years who have moderate to severe intellectual impairments at 20 Park Street (corner of Rosella Street), West Gladstone. In 2017 the school had an enrolment of 75 students with 20 teachers (19 full-time equivalent) and 30 non-teaching staff (19 full-time equivalent). Due to the specialised nature of the school, its students are drawn from all over Gladstone and beyond into the wider Gladstone Region.

Gladstone State High School is a government secondary (7–12) school for boys and girls at 30 Dawson Road, West Gladstone. In 2017 the school had an enrolment of 1509 students with 123 teachers (115 full-time equivalent) and 61 non-teaching staff (45 full-time equivalent).

Toolooa State High School is a government secondary (7–12) school for boys and girls at 2 Phillip Street, South Gladstone. In 2018 the school had an enrolment of 1,004 students with 85 teachers (79 full-time equivalent) and 51 non-teaching staff (33 full-time equivalent).

It has two main private schools: St Johns and Trinity College.

It also has two university campuses, Central Queensland University. Gladstone was also formerly home to CQIT (TAFE) Gladstone Campus, before it combined with Central Queensland University, becoming the Gladstone City Campus.

Community facilities 
The Gladstone Regional Council operates Gladstone Library at 39 Goondoon Street, Gladstone.

The Gladstone branch of the Queensland Country Women's Association meets at the QCWA Hall at 88 Oaka Lane, Gladstone Central.

Recreation 

Gladstone has direct access to Heron Island, Wilson Island, Curtis Island and other islands from the marina and local airstrips.

Boyne Island and Tannum Sands 

Boyne Island and Tannum Sands have grown in popularity because of their beautiful beaches and relaxed lifestyle. The Millennium Esplanade is a big attraction where there are lots of shelters, barbecues and walking paths, and long stretches of beach. Boyne Island and Tannum Sands are not part of the Gladstone township but are part of the Gladstone region and formerly part of the Calliope Shire.

Lake Awoonga 

A little further afield (25 km south of Gladstone) is Lake Awoonga. The recreation area has free barbecues, swimming, landscaped walking trails, as well as a caravan park. The lake has been stocked with several fish species since 1996, and over 2 million barramundi have been released. In addition to the fishing, Lake Awoonga has many natural attractions, especially the wildlife, with more than 225 species of birds (or over 27% of Australia's bird species) found in the region. Lake Awoonga is also the primary source of Gladstone's water supply. Awoonga dam is not part of the Gladstone township but is part of the Gladstone region and formerly part of the Calliope Shire.

Politics
In the House of Representatives, Gladstone is located within the division of Flynn, a traditionally marginal seat currently held by Liberal National MP Colin Boyce, who was first elected in 2022. At the state level, it is within the electorate of Gladstone, and is a safe Labor seat held by Glenn Butcher, who has represented it since the 2015 Queensland state election.

Transport 

Rail 

Gladstone is a major stop on the North Coast railway line, with long-distance passenger trains operated by QR Traveltrain stopping in the area. Gladstone is also the transshipping point for export coal from the Moura and Blackwater coal basins and is one of the largest coal export ports in The Southern Hemisphere. Currently, coal trains of up to 1.7 km in length and 10,600 tonnes' gross weight are run by rail operators Aurizon and Pacific National to unload at coal terminals at Barney Point, Clinton, and Yarwun. Domestic coal is also railed to the Gladstone Power Station and the Queensland Alumina Limited refinery. An extensive rail facility is located at Callemondah to support these operations.

Gladstone was also a major terminus for rail freight and bulk fuel, with extensive marshaling yards at Gladstone, South Gladstone, and Auckland Point. As is the case in much of Queensland this traffic, declining from the 1990s, has now ceased with goods carried by road.

Air 

The main provider of scheduled passenger air services has been QantasLink, using mostly Bombardier Q400 aircraft though Flight West Airlines and Ansett also previously offered service. Strategic Airlines briefly offered services in 2011 and Virgin Australia commenced flights in October 2011 and now offers up to 6 return flights a day to Brisbane mostly on ATR 72 aircraft with Embraer 190 and Boeing 737 also a regular appearance in the schedule. New players JetGo started flying direct services from Sydney in December 2014. The service was offered twice daily, in 36-seat Embraer 135LR jets but ceased in February 2015. Bonza announced in February 2022 that the airport would become one of its 17 destinations with the airline planning to fly to Melbourne from Gladstone. Services are scheduled to start in May 2023.

In May 2009, a $65 million upgrade to the airport and nearby area was undertaken, which reached completion in 2011.

Sea
The Port of Gladstone is Queensland's largest multi-commodity port and the fifth-largest multi-commodity port in Australia. It is the world's fourth-largest coal-exporting terminal.

Media

News Publications

Gladstone has a free fortnightly independent community newspaper called Gladstone News, delivered to 220 business hotspots and community points.

Radio
4CC is Gladstone's local AM commercial radio station, owned by Grant Broadcasters. 4CC has one full-time announcer based in Gladstone to present the station's local breakfast show. The station broadcasts to Central Queensland on four separate frequencies via three AM transmitters in Gladstone, Biloela and Rockhampton, and an FM translator in Agnes Water on the Discovery Coast.

Hit Central Queensland is Gladstone's local FM commercial radio station, owned by Southern Cross Austereo. Hot FM has two full-time announcers based in Gladstone to present the station's flagship weekday breakfast program, which is also broadcast to Rockhampton and Emerald.

Gladstone also receives radio stations that carry local programming from Rockhampton including commercial radio stations Triple M Central Queensland and 4RO. Triple M broadcasts on a separate FM frequency in Gladstone.

ABC Capricornia also broadcasts into Gladstone from Rockhampton, using a separate FM frequency. Until November 2014, ABC Capricornia maintained a local news bureau in Gladstone where a local journalist was based to cover the Gladstone region. Some local news bulletins on ABC Capricornia were also broadcast live from Gladstone. However, in what was a controversial decision, the ABC's Gladstone office was permanently closed in late 2014 as a cost-cutting measure following the Federal Government's decision to withdraw $254 million in funding to the ABC.

91.9 Fresh FM is Gladstone's local community radio radio station, which has a Christian radio format.

Television

WIN Television, Seven Queensland, Southern Cross Ten, ABC and SBS stations are all able to be received in Gladstone.

The Central Queensland editions of WIN News and Seven Local News, both regularly feature news content directly relating to the Gladstone region. Seven Queensland employ a journalist and camera operator in Gladstone, while WIN Television dispatch a news crew from Rockhampton to cover news stories in Gladstone.

The weekly 'What's On' segment on Seven Local News is also presented from Gladstone.

Sports teams 

 Gladstone PCYC Roller Derby: Gladstone Hustlers, Gladstone Haul Stars
 Australian rules football / AFL Capricornia: Gladstone Mudcrabs
 Cricket / Gladstone Cricket Inc.: Gladstone Brothers, The Glen, Yaralla
 Basketball / Queensland Basketball League: Gladstone Port City Power (Men's) & (Women's)
 Soccer / CQ Premier League: Clinton FC
 Soccer / Gladstone Senior Mens: Central SC, Clinton FC, Gladstone United FC, Meteors FC, Yaralla FC.
 Rugby league / Rockhampton District Rugby League: Past Brothers, Valleys Rugby league / Gladstone District Rugby League: Rebels, Wallabys Rugby union / Central QLD Rugby Union: Gladstone RUFC Volleyball / Volleyball Queensland: Gladstone Thunder''

Notable residents 
James Henry Ashton (1819–1889) – founder of Ashton's Circus, died and buried in Gladstone
William Robert (Bill) Golding (1890–1985) – builder, historian, local government councillor, local government head, public servant, public service head.
Percival Albert Gourgaud (1881–1958) – public servant, public servant head.
Gary Larson (b. 1967) – Former Queensland and Australian Rugby League player.
Henry John (Jack) Manning (1889–1978) – company managing director, journalist, newspaper executive, newspaper owner.
Hayley Marsten (b. 1994) – awarded country singer/songwriter.
Frederick Woolnough Paterson (1897–1977) – barrister, communist, farmer, local government councillor, Member of Lower House, school teacher, soldier.
Valentine Thomas Vallis (1916–2006) – poet, opera critic, university reader, soldier, local government counter clerk

Sister City 
As part of Sister Cities Australia Inc. (SCA) the Gladstone Region began a Sister City relationship with Saiki City, Oita Prefecture, Japan in 1996.

See also 

 Beautiful Betsy
 The Boyne Valley
 Kroombit Tops National Park

References

External links 

 
 University of Queensland: Queensland Places: Gladstone
 Gladstone Information

 
1847 establishments in Australia
Coastal cities in Australia
Gladstone Region
Populated places established in 1847
Port cities in Queensland
Fishing communities in Australia